Filathlitikos may refer to:

Filathlitikos Thessaloniki, volleyball team, based in Thessaloniki
Filathlitikos B.C., basketball team, based in Zografou, Athens